Charles Whitney Coombs (1859, Bucksport, Maine – 1940, Montclair, New Jersey) was an American composer and organist. He was prolific in both sacred and secular music.

Works
 "The Four Leaf Clover"

References

1859 births
1940 deaths
American male composers
American composers
People from Bucksport, Maine
People from Montclair, New Jersey
American male organists
Musicians from Maine
American organists